The men's 20 miles walk event at the 1970 British Commonwealth Games was held on 18 July in Edinburgh, Scotland.

Results

References

Athletics at the 1970 British Commonwealth Games
1970